Barana is a union council of Lalian tehsil in Chiniot District, Punjab province, Pakistan. It lies at the boundary with Sargodha District and is situated in Bhatiore region. This town is also a part of Kirana Bar area.

See also 

 Chenab River
 Bhawana

References 

Populated places in Chiniot District